

Ludwig Kirschner (12 June 1904 – 11 February 1945) was a general in the Wehrmacht of Nazi Germany during World War II who commanded the 320. Volksgrenadier-Division.  He was a recipient of the Knight's Cross of the Iron Cross with Oak Leaves.  Kirschner was killed on 11 February 1945 in Saybusch, Poland.

Awards and decorations
 Iron Cross (1939)  2nd Class (31 December 1940) & 1st Class (14 September 1941)
 Honour Roll Clasp of the Army (8 February 1942)
 Knight's Cross of the Iron Cross with Oak Leaves
 Knight's Cross on 18 January 1942 as Major and commander of the I./Infanterie-Regiment 436
 Oak Leaves on 28 October 1942 as Oberstleutnant and commander of Infanterie-Regiment 72

References

Citations

Bibliography

 
 

1904 births
1945 deaths
People from Bayreuth
People from the Kingdom of Bavaria
Major generals of the German Army (Wehrmacht)
Recipients of the Knight's Cross of the Iron Cross with Oak Leaves
German Army personnel killed in World War II
Military personnel from Bavaria